A piecewise-constant valuation is a kind of a function that represents the utility of an agent over a continuous resource, such as land. It occurs when the resource can be partitioned into a finite number of regions, and in each region, the value-density of the agent is constant. A piecewise-uniform valuation is a piecewise-constant valuation in which the constant is the same in all regions.

Piecewise-constant and piecewise-uniform valuations are particularly useful in algorithms for fair cake-cutting.

Formal definition 
There is a resource represented by a set C. There is a valuation over the resource, defined as a continuous measure . The measure V can be represented by a value-density function . The value-density function assigns, to each point of the resource, a real value. The measure V of each subset X of C is the integral of v over X.

A valuation V is called piecewise-constant, if the corresponding value-density function v is a piecewise-constant function. In other words: there is a partition of the resource C into finitely many regions, C1,...,Ck, such that for each j in 1,...,k, the function v inside Cj equals some constant Uj.

A valuation V is called piecewise-uniform if the constant is the same for all regions, that is, for each j in 1,...,k, the function v inside Cj equals some constant U.

Generalization 
A piecewise-linear valuation is a generalization of piecewise-constant valuation in which the value-density in each region j is a linear function, ajx+bj (piecewise-constant corresponds to the special case in which aj=0 for all j).

References 

Utility function types
Cake-cutting